Terrain visualization may refer to:

Terrain rendering
Terrain cartography